Suvro Banerjee is a consultant interventional cardiologist, practicing in Kolkata. He has worked at various hospitals in the United Kingdom, and is a Fellow of the Royal College of Physicians of London as well as Edinburgh. His procedural skills, among others, include coronary and peripheral angioplasty, pacemaker, ICD and CRT implantation. He is the first doctor in Kolkata to successfully use the ICD which is the Implantable Carvioverter Defibrillatorto to treat a patient's abnormal heart rhythm.

Banerjee is a clinical examiner for the MRCP (UK) examinations in India. He is also a postgraduate teacher in Indira Gandhi Open University (IGNOU). He was the Steering Committee member for The Indian Consensus Guidance on Stroke Prevention in Atrial Fibrillation (2015) and Joint Convener for the Cardiological Society of India (CSI) Guideline Committee position statement on the management of heart failure (2017). He is a member of the Editorial Advisory Board for Indian Heart Journal Interventions. Currently, he is the Overseas Regional Adviser for East Region of India and West Bengal. He has also been involved as Principal Investigator in epidemiological studies with University of Calgary, Canada and Coventry & Warwickshire NHS Trust, UK. His work on the "Prevalence, awareness and control of hypertension in the slums of Kolkata" was carried out in collaboration with Kolkata Municipal Corporation. He has been conferred the fellowship of European Society of Cardiology and the American College of Cardiology.

He was the Honorary Treasurer of West Bengal Academy of Echocardiography, a post which he has held since 2013. Additionally, he was the Secretary of the Cardiological Society of India, West Bengal Branch (2017-2018).

For his philanthropic and social work, Dr. Banerjee was recognized by Rotary International as a Paul Harris Fellow in 2004. He regularly contributes to newspapers on matters of health and heart related diseases.

References

Year of birth missing (living people)
Living people
British people of Indian descent
Interventional radiology
Fellows of the American College of Cardiology